The 2016 Internazionali Femminili di Brescia was a professional tennis tournament played on outdoor clay courts. It was the ninth edition of the tournament and part of the 2016 ITF Women's Circuit, offering a total of $50,000 in prize money. It took place in Brescia, Italy, on 30 May–5 June 2016.

Singles main draw entrants

Seeds 

 1 Rankings as of 23 May 2016.

Other entrants 
The following player received a wildcard into the singles main draw:
  Georgia Brescia
  Nastassja Burnett
  Cristiana Ferrando
  Claudia Giovine

The following players received entry from the qualifying draw:
  Julia Grabher
  Beatriz Haddad Maia
  Ana Sofía Sánchez
  Viktoriya Tomova

Champions

Singles

 Karin Knapp def.  Jesika Malečková, 6–1, 6–2

Doubles

 Deborah Chiesa /  Martina Colmegna def.  Cindy Burger /  Stephanie Vogt, 6–3, 1–6, [12–10]

References

External links 
 2016 Internazionali Femminili di Brescia at ITFtennis.com
 Official website 

2016 ITF Women's Circuit
2016 in Italian tennis
Tennis tournaments in Italy